Hasanabad-e Vosta (also Romanized as Ḩasanābād-e Vosţá; also known as Ḩasanābād-e Pā’īn) is a village in Karvan-e Sofla Rural District, Karvan District, Tiran and Karvan County, Isfahan Province, Iran. At the 2006 census, its population was 1,421, in 326 families.

References 

Populated places in Tiran and Karvan County